Bandicoots are a group of more than 20 species of small to medium-sized, terrestrial, largely nocturnal marsupial omnivores in the order Peramelemorphia. They are endemic to the Australia–New Guinea region, including the Bismarck Archipelago to the east and Seram and Halmahera to the west.

Etymology 
The bandicoot is a member of the order Peramelemorphia, and the word "bandicoot" is often used informally to refer to any peramelemorph, such as the bilby. The term originally referred to the unrelated Indian bandicoot rat from the Telugu word pandikokku (పందికొక్కు).

Characteristics 
Bandicoots have V-shaped faces, ending with their prominent noses similar to proboscis. These noses make them, along with bilbies, similar in appearance to elephant shrews and extinct leptictids, and they are distantly related to both mammal groups. With their well-attuned snouts and sharp claws, bandicoot are fossorial diggers. They have small but fine teeth that allow them to easily chew their food.

Like most marsupials, male bandicoots have bifurcated penises.

The embryos of bandicoots have a chorioallantoic placenta that connects them to the uterine wall, in addition to the choriovitelline placenta that is common to all marsupials. However, the chorioallantoic placenta is small compared to those of the Placentalia, and lacks chorionic villi.

A bandicoot has a long, pointed snout, large ears, a short body, and a long tail. Its body is covered with fur that can be brown, black, golden, white, or gray in color. Bandicoots have strong hind legs well adapted for jumping.

Classification 
Classification within the Peramelemorphia was previously thought to be straightforward, with two families in the order—the short-legged and mostly herbivorous bandicoots, and the longer-legged, nearly carnivorous bilbies. In recent years, however, the situation clearly has become more complex. First, the bandicoots of the New Guinean and far-northern Australian rainforests were deemed distinct from all other bandicoots and were grouped together in the separate family Peroryctidae. More recently, the bandicoot families were reunited in the Peramelidae, with the New Guinean species split into four genera in two subfamilies, Peroryctinae and Echymiperinae, while the "true bandicoots" occupy the subfamily Peramelinae. The only exception is the now-extinct pig-footed bandicoot, which has been given its own family, Chaeropodidae.

 Order Peramelemorphia
Superfamily Perameloidea
Unclassified family
 Genus †Galadi: 4 species
 Genus †Bulungu: 3 species
 Genus †Madju: 2 species
 Family Thylacomyidae
 Genus Macrotis: 2 species
 Genus †Ischnodon: 1 species
 Genus †Liyamayi: 1 extinct species
 Family †Chaeropodidae: Pig-footed bandicoot
 Genus †Chaeropus: 1 species
 Family Peramelidae
 Subfamily Peramelinae
 Genus Isoodon: short-nosed bandicoots, 3 species
 Genus Perameles: long-nosed bandicoots, 3 extant species
 Subfamily Peroryctinae
 Genus Peroryctes: New Guinean long-nosed bandicoots, 2 species
 Subfamily Echymiperinae
 Genus Echymipera: New Guinean spiny bandicoots, 5 species
 Genus Microperoryctes: New Guinean mouse bandicoots, 5 species
 Genus Rhynchomeles: Seram bandicoot, 1 species
 Superfamily †Yaraloidea
 Family †Yaralidae
 Genus †Yarala: 2 species

Vernacular names
The name bandicoot is an Anglicised version of a word from the Telugu language of South India which translates as 'pig-rat'. What are now called bandicoots are not found in India and bandicoot was originally applied to completely unrelated mammals—several species of large rats (rodents). Today, these species, belonging to the genera Bandicota and Nesokia, are referred to as bandicoot rats. 

Blust reconstructs the form *mansar or *mansər 'bandicoot' for Proto-Central–Eastern Malayo-Polynesian (i.e., the reconstructed most recent common ancestor of the Central–Eastern Malayo-Polynesian languages) from related words like Oceanic Motu  and Fijian , but the validity of this reconstruction is doubted by Schapper (2011). It is known as aine in the Abinomn language of Papua, Indonesia.

Bandicoots have different names by the indigenous peoples of the Australia-New Guinea region. For example, the Kaurna people refer to the southern brown bandicoot as the bung or the marti.

References

External links 
 

Peramelemorphs
Marsupials of Oceania
Marsupials of Australia
Mammals of Papua New Guinea
Mammals of Western New Guinea

es:Bandicut